Frano Lasić (born 12 November 1954) is a Croatian actor and pop singer.

Filmography

Television roles 
 "Jack Holborn" (1982)
 "The Winds of War" (1983)
 "Kiklop" as Melkior Tresić (1983)
 "The Fortunate Pilgrim" as Dr. Eschen (1988)
 "Dirty Dozen: The Series" as Steinmetz (1988)
 "Obiteljska stvar" as Goran Nadalli (1998)
 "Lisice" as gynecologist (2003)
 "Crna hronika" as Jeff (2004)
 "Villa Maria" as Dr. Andrija Posavec (2004–2005)
 "Obični ljudi" as Nikola Lončarić (2007)
 "Zabranjena ljubav" as Marinko Ružić (2006–2008)
 "Bitange i princeze" as coronel (2009)
 "Ples sa zvijezdama" as Frano Lasić (2009)
 "Dolina sunca" as Toni Herceg (2010)
"Ruža vjetrova" as Milivoj Matošić (2011–2012)
"Zvezdara" as ministar Jojić (2013)
"Jedne letnje noći" as Ivo (2015)
"Budva na pjenu od mora" as grof Graziano (2015)
"Selo gori a baba se češlja" as Frano (2016)
"Don't Bet on the Brits" as Dimitrije (2018)
"Miss Scarlet and the Duke" (2020.)
"Alexander of Yugoslavia" as David Lloyd George (2021)
"Dnevnik velikog Perice" as Kustos (2021)
"Beležnica profesora Miškovića" as Vagner (2021)
"Ubice mog oca" as attorney Žegarac (2022)

Movie roles 
 "Okupacija u 26 slika" as Niko (1978)
 "Švabica" (1980)
 "Splav meduze" as Aleksa Ristić (1980)
 "Pad Italije" as Niko (1981)
 "Kiklop" as Melkior Tresić (1982)
 "Nastojanje" (1982)
 "Servantes iz Malog mista" (1982)
 "U logoru" as Šimunić (1983)
 "Groznica ljubavi" as Oto Müeller (1984)
 "The Aviator" as Daniel Hansen (1985)
 "The Magic Snowman" as Ned (1987)
 "Slučaj Harms" as Danil Harms (1994)
 "Fatal Sky" as Bergen (1990)
 "Noćna straža" (1995)
 "Kanjon opasnih igara" as Horst Keller (1998)
 "Dubrovački suton" (1999)
 "Fade to Black" as Dellere (2006)
"Vjerujem u anđele" as Tino (2009)
"The White Crow" as ruski konobar (2018)
 "Elegija lovora" as Filip (2021)
 "Leto kada sam načila da letim" (2022)

References

External links
 

1954 births
Living people
20th-century Croatian male actors
Croatian male stage actors
Croatian male film actors
Croatian male television actors
20th-century Croatian male singers
Croatian pop singers
Actors from Rijeka
21st-century Croatian male actors